In the Meantime may refer to:

 In the Meantime (Alessia Cara album), 2021
 In the Meantime (Christine McVie album), 2004
 In the Meantime (Watershed album), by Watershed, 2002 
 In the Meantime (Joe Pug EP), 2010
 In the Meantime, a 2018 EP by Spacey Jane
 "In the Meantime" (Helmet song), 1992
 "In the Meantime" (Spacehog song), 1996
 In the Meantime (book), a 2000 self-help book by Iyanla Vanzant

See also
 In the Meantime and In Between Time, a 2004 album by SNFU
 In the Meantime, Darling, a 1944 American drama film
 In the Meantime, In Between Time, a 1991 album by the Party